Ulvila is a town and municipality of Finland. It is one of the six medieval cities of Finland, as well as the third oldest city in the country. Ulvila was granted charter as a town by King Albert of Sweden on 7 February 1365. However, its town privileges were taken over by Pori in 1558. After 442 years, Ulvila regained town privileges in 2000.

Ulvila is located in the region of Satakunta and the former province of Western Finland.

The municipality is unilingually Finnish.

The medieval St. Olaf's Church is dedicated to St. Olaf, who also is portrayed in the arms of the municipality. The medieval fieldstone church, also known as Ulvila Church, is one of the best-preserved of its kind in Finland.

Politics 
Results of the Finnish municipal elections 2021 in Ulvila:

 Social Democratic Party 29.6%
 National Coalition Party 23.4%
 Centre Party 15.3%
 True Finns 14.5%
 Left Alliance 9.1%
 Christian Democrats 4.8%
 Green League 3.3%
 Blue future 0.1%

Transport
Ulvila is served by OnniBus.com route Helsinki—Pori.

International relations

Twin towns — Sister cities
Ulvila is twinned with:

  Ljusdal Municipality, Sweden  
  Suure-Jaani, Estonia

Notable people from Ulvila 

 Simo Frangén (born 1963) – television presenter and humorist
 Kaarlo Kangasniemi (born 1941) – weightlifter and sports personality
 Kauko Kangasniemi (1942–2013) – weightlifter
 Mauno Lindroos (born 1941) – weightlifter
 Patrik Raitanen (born 2001) – footballer
 Karl Reilin (1874–1962) – sports shooter
 Raili Riuttala (born 1933) – freestyle swimmer
 Sylvi Salonen (1920–2003) – actress
 Sofianna Sundelin (born 2003) – ice hockey player
 Kalle Varonen (born 1974) – freestyle swimmer

See also
Finnish national road 2
Finnish national road 11
Kokemäki
Kullaa
Ulvila Old Town
2006 Ulvila homicide case

References

External links

 
  

 
Cities and towns in Finland
Medieval Finnish towns
Populated places established in the 1360s